Bjørneboe is a surname. Notable people with the surname include:

Agnete Bjørneboe (born 1943), Tanzanian-born Danish artist and educator
Jens Bjørneboe (1920–1976), Norwegian writer 
Sven Kærup Bjørneboe (born 1943), Norwegian essayist
Therese Bjørneboe (born 1963), Norwegian theatre critic and editor